Willow Creek Wildlife Area, located in northeastern Oregon, United States, near the Columbia River, is operated by the Oregon Department of Fish and Wildlife.  Birds watchers may find birds of prey, waterfowl, wading birds, songbirds and shorebirds.

It is one of four wildlife areas in the Columbia Basin, all open seven days a week. The other three are Coyote Springs, Irrigon, and Power City Wildlife Areas. Visitors may hunt deer, pheasant, quail, duck, geese and mourning doves. Boat access is provided and camping is allowed in a designated parking area. There are no restroom facilities.

References

External links
 Willow Creek Wildlife Area, Oregon Department of Fish and Wildlife.
 Oregon Game Bird Regulations
 Willow Creek Wildlife Area map

Oregon state wildlife areas
Protected areas of Gilliam County, Oregon